Bethany Danish Evangelical Lutheran Church is a historic church in Kimballton, in Audubon County, Iowa.  It was built in 1898 and was added to the National Register in 1991.

It is a T-shaped one-story gable-front frame building with a central entry tower, similar to other Danish churches in Audubon County and adjacent Shelby County.  It faces to the west, and has an ell on the north which was built in 1906 to serve as a schoolhouse.

It was deemed significant in part for its association with the history of the Danish Lutheran Church, which split in 1894, in the two county area. It was built, at least partly, by skilled Danish carpenter/cabinet-maker, Nis P. Hjuler, and reflects Danish decorative arts.

See also
Immanuel Danish Evangelical Lutheran Church, also in Kimballton, also NRHP-listed

References

Danish-American culture in Iowa
Lutheran churches in Iowa
Churches on the National Register of Historic Places in Iowa
Churches completed in 1898
Buildings and structures in Audubon County, Iowa
1898 establishments in Iowa
National Register of Historic Places in Audubon County, Iowa